Patricia Hernández Gutiérrez (born 21 February 1980) is a Spanish politician representing Canary Island, leader of the Socialist Party of the Canaries (PSOE) in the Parliament, and the mayor of Santa Cruz de Tenerife since 2019.

Early life
Born in Santa Cruz de Tenerife, Hernández graduated with a degree in labour relations from the University of La Laguna (1998–2002). Previously she studied cello at the Conservatory of Music of the Canary Islands (1990–98).

Career
A member of the Socialist Party of the Canaries (PSOE), Hernández represented Santa Cruz de Tenerife in the Cortes Generales from 2004 to 2015, as a senator for seven years and later as a deputy. Within her party administration she has served as the General Secretary of Socialist Youth of Spain in Tenerife (2002–08) and since 2013, has been the PSOE general secretary from Tenerife.

The  have honoured her with their "Senator Revelation" title. After defeating Carolina Darias San Sebastián and Gustavo Matos in primary elections of PSOE in October 2014, she became the first women candidate for the post of President of the Canary Islands. However, PSOE formed a coalition with Canarian Coalition after the results of 2015 Canarian regional election were announced and Hernández was chosen the Vice President and Councilor for Employment, Social Policies and Housing.

On June 15, 2019 she became the first socialist mayor of Santa Cruz de Tenerife, ending forty uninterrupted years of Canary Coalition governments in the capital, being also the first woman to hold the mayor's office of Santa Cruz.

References

1980 births
Living people
Women members of the Congress of Deputies (Spain)
People from Santa Cruz de Tenerife
Members of the Senate of Spain
Members of the 9th Parliament of the Canary Islands
Members of the 10th Parliament of the Canary Islands